The Forward Operating Base Marez bombing took place on December 21, 2004.  Fourteen U.S. soldiers, four U.S. citizen Halliburton employees, and four Iraqi soldiers allied with the U.S. military were killed by a suicide bomber in a dining hall at the Forward Operating Base next to the main U.S. military airfield at Mosul.

Pentagon report
The Pentagon reported that 72 other personnel were injured in the attack carried out by a suicide bomber wearing an explosive vest and the uniform of the Iraqi security services. The Islamist insurgent group Army of Ansar al-Sunna (partly evolved from Ansar al-Islam) released an internet message taking credit for the attack. The bomber entered the mess tent and approached a large group of U.S. soldiers, detonating himself and killing 22 people. It was the single deadliest suicide attack against the US military in Iraq.

After attack
Weeks before the attack, soldiers from the base intercepted a document that mentioned a proposal for a massive "Beirut"-type attack on U.S. forces. The reference was apparently to the 1983 Beirut barracks bombing in which 241 U.S. service members were killed.

Ansar al-Sunnah said the suicide bomber was a 24-year-old man from Mosul who worked at the base for two months and had provided information about the base to the group.

The AP reported that the bomber was a twenty-year-old medical student from Saudi Arabia. A US Army report identified a different Saudi national as the suicide bomber and said he got help from Iraqi troops working at the base.

The dead
 Fallen soldiers from 133rd Engineer Battalion (Maine); Sergeant Thomas Dostie of Somerville, Maine, Sergeant Lynn R. Poulin Sr. of Freedom, Maine
 Fallen soldier from 1st Battalion, 5th Infantry Regiment "Bobcats", Ft Lewis, WA); SSG Julian S. Melo
 Fallen soldiers from Deuce Four Infantry (1/24- Ft Lewis, WA); CPT William Jacobsen, SSG Robert Johnson, SPC Johnathon Castro, PFC Lionel Ayro 
 Fallen Soldiers from C276 Eng (Virginia National Guard, West Point, VA); Sgt Nick Mason, Sgt David Ruhren
 Fallen Soldier from 2nd Squadron, 14th Cavalry Regiment; SSG Darren Vankomen
 Fallen Sailor from NMCB-7; Chief Petty Officer Joel Baldwin
Iraqi Army Chief Warrant Officer Majdee Yousef Aziz, Iraqi Army 1st Lt. Mushtag Satar Jabar, Iraqi Army Sgt. Ahmad Hashem Mahdi, Iraqi National Guardsman Sherzad Kamo Bro

See also 
 Battle of Mosul - Iraq War
 Iraq War

References

External links 
Deadly Attack on U.S. Military Base FoxNews
"A Few Unforeseen Things", by Elliott Woods, Virginia Quarterly Review, Fall 2008. Video interviews with the families and comrades of two victims of the attack.

Suicide bombings in 2004
2004 murders in Iraq
21st-century mass murder in Iraq
Iraq War
2004 in Iraq
Suicide bombings in Iraq
Mass murder in 2004
Terrorist incidents in Iraq in 2004
December 2004 events in Iraq
History of Mosul